The 2015 Tour de Romandie was the 69th edition of the Tour de Romandie stage race. It took place from 28 April to 3 May and was the fourteenth race of the 2015 UCI World Tour. The race took place around the Romandy region of Switzerland, starting in Lac de Joux and finishing in Lausanne. The race included six stages, with a team time trial at the beginning and an individual time trial at the end with four hilly or mountainous stages in between. The queen stage was the fifth stage, which finished on the climb above Champex.

The defending champion was Chris Froome, who won both the 2013 and 2014 editions.

Teams 
The Tour de Romandie was part of the UCI World Tour, which meant that the 17 UCI WorldTeams were automatically invited and obliged to send a team. The race organisers also invited UCI Professional Continental team  as a wildcard, to make a peloton of 18 teams. Each team entered eight riders (the maximum permitted), so 144 riders started the first stage.

Race route 
The race included six stages over six days. The first stage was a  team time trial; this was a change from recent editions of the Tour de Romandie, which started with a prologue individual time trial. The team time trial was important both for its role in the general classification and also because the teams were using it as preparation for a similar stage in the Tour de France. Stages 2, 3 and 4 were all hilly but were expected to end in sprints. The final two stages were expected to be the decisive ones in the general classification: the fifth stage included several climbs and a summit finish at Champex and the sixth stage was a  individual time trial around Lausanne.

Pre-race favourites 

The principal favourite for the race was Chris Froome. Froome was the defending champion, having won both the 2013 and 2014 editions. Sky had also won in 2012 with Bradley Wiggins. Froome's form, however, was uncertain. He had shown good form early in the season by beating Alberto Contador at the Vuelta a Andalucía, but afterwards fell ill. He withdrew from Tirreno–Adriatico, then performed poorly in the Volta a Catalunya. He returned to racing the week before the Tour de Romandie in La Flèche Wallonne, but crashed towards the end of the race. Although he was able to finish the race, Froome had lost some skin in the crash. L'Équipe described him as "in need of reassurance" following his "chaotic start to the season".

The other principal favourites ahead of the race were Nairo Quintana, who had won Tirreno–Adriatico earlier in the season, and Vincenzo Nibali, the reigning Tour de France champion. Quintana had recently finished in fourth place in the Tour of the Basque Country and was seen as a particular threat in the mountains. Nibali, meanwhile, had ridden aggressively in the Ardennes classics but had not won a race since the previous July; L'Équipe described him as "in search of a convincing result in 2015". Other favourites included Nibali's teammate Jakob Fuglsang, Simon Špilak, Rigoberto Urán, Rui Costa, Thibaut Pinot, Simon Yates and Mathias Frank.

Stages

Stage 1 

28 April 2015 – Vallée de Joux to Juraparc de Vallorbe, team time trial (TTT)

The first stage of the race was a  team time trial. In this event, each team set off together; the team's time was that of the fifth rider across the finish line. The riders who arrived at the same time as the fifth rider or before him were credited with the team's time; riders who arrived after the fifth rider were credited with their actual arrival time. The teams set off at five-minute intervals:  set off first at 15:45 and  set off last at 17:10. The course went through L'Orient, then continued along the southern coast of the lake through L'Abbaye and Le Pont at the northern end of the lake. The course to this point had been generally flat, but the last  of the course included the climb of the Col du Mont d'Orzeires and the descent to the finish line in the Juraparc de Vallorbe.

's lead lasted some time as the next six teams to set off were all slower. The team had five riders together (the minimum permitted) as they crossed the line, with the Swiss Michael Albasini crossing the line first.

The final teams to set off included the world champions in the team time trial, and the former world champions, . Geraint Thomas was the first rider across the line and so was the first leader of the race; he had previously worn the yellow jersey in the 2012 Tour de Romandie. Luke Rowe was the best young rider after the first stage, while 11 riders shared the same time as Thomas.

Stage 2 
29 April 2015 – Apples to Saint-Imier,

Stage 3 
30 April 2015 – Moutier to Porrentruy,

Stage 4 
1 May 2015 – La Neuveville to Fribourg,

Stage 5 
2 May 2015 – Fribourg to Champex,

Stage 6 
3 May 2015 – Lausanne to Lausanne, individual time trial (ITT)

Classification leadership table 

In the 2015 Tour de Romandie, four jerseys were awarded. The general classification was calculated by adding up each cyclist's finishing times on each stage. Time bonuses were awarded to the first three finishers on road stages (stages 2–5): the stage winner won a ten-second bonus, with six and four seconds for the second and third riders respectively. No bonus seconds were awarded at intermediate sprints. The leader of the general classification received a yellow jersey. This classification was considered the most important of the Tour, and the winner of the classification was considered the winner of the race. The young rider classification was based on the general classification: the highest-ranked rider born after 1 January 1990 was the leader of the classification and wore a white jersey.

There was a mountains classification; the leader of this competition wore a pink jersey. Over the road stages of the race, there were 15 classified climbs, each of which was ranked as first-category, second-category or third-category. The first riders to cross the summit of the climbs won points towards the mountain classification. On first-category climbs, the first five riders won points with the first of these winning 12 points. Points were also awarded to the first five riders across the summit of second-category climbs, though the winner only won 8 points. On third-category climbs, only the first four riders won points, with the first rider winning five points. There was also a sprints classification. On each of the road stages, there were two intermediate sprints. The first rider in these sprints won 6 points; the second rider won 3 points; the third rider won 1 point. No points were awarded at stage finishes. The winner of the classification won a green jersey.

The final individual classification was a combativity prize. After each road stage, a jury chose the rider on the basis of sportsmanship and effort in the stage. The rider was awarded a red dossard (race number) for the following stage. After the final stage, the jury chose the most combative rider of the race overall.

The final classification was a team classification. This was calculated by adding together the times of the best three riders on each team in each stage except the team time trial. In this stage, the team's finishing time was that of the fifth rider across the line.

References

Sources

External links 
 

Tour de Romandie
Tour de Romandie
Tour de Romandie